Glaucélio Serrão Abreu (born 5 February 1978) is a Brazilian boxer. He competed in the 2004 Summer Olympics.

References

1978 births
Living people
Boxers at the 2004 Summer Olympics
Brazilian male boxers
Olympic boxers of Brazil
Pan American Games medalists in boxing
Pan American Games bronze medalists for Brazil
South American Games gold medalists for Brazil
South American Games medalists in boxing
Boxers at the 2007 Pan American Games
Competitors at the 2002 South American Games
Middleweight boxers
Medalists at the 2007 Pan American Games
20th-century Brazilian people
21st-century Brazilian people